Mohit Ahlawat may refer to:

 Mohit Ahlawat (actor) (born 1982)
 Mohit Ahlawat (cricketer) (born 1995) plays for Services